Gilles Quénéhervé (born 17 May 1966) is a retired French sprinter who specialized in the 200 metres.

Biography
At the 1987 World Championships in Rome he won the silver medal in a time of 20.16, which still stood as a French record for 24 years until it was broken by Christophe Lemaitre at the 2011 World Championships in Daegu.

At the 1988 Summer Olympics in Seoul, he won a bronze medal in the 4x100 metres relay with his teammates Bruno Marie-Rose, Daniel Sangouma and Max Morinière.

Achievements

References

External links

1966 births
Living people
French male sprinters
Athletes (track and field) at the 1988 Summer Olympics
Athletes (track and field) at the 1992 Summer Olympics
Olympic athletes of France
Olympic bronze medalists for France
Athletes from Paris
World Athletics Championships medalists
Medalists at the 1988 Summer Olympics
Olympic bronze medalists in athletics (track and field)
20th-century French people
21st-century French people